Hans Bredmose (23 August 1888 – 18 December 1958) was a Danish gymnast. He competed in the men's team event at the 1908 Summer Olympics.

References

1888 births
1958 deaths
Danish male artistic gymnasts
Olympic gymnasts of Denmark
Gymnasts at the 1908 Summer Olympics
Sportspeople from Copenhagen